You Are My Sassy Girl is a 2014 Chinese romantic comedy film directed by Zheng Li. It was released on September 12, 2014.

Cast
Shi Tianshuo
Mo Xi-er
Kenneth Tsang
Lam Wai
Yi Liqi
Jin Yi
Tu Yanni
Wang Wenqi

Reception
It has earned ¥0.71 million at the Chinese box office.

References

2014 romantic comedy films
2014 films
Chinese romantic comedy films
2010s Mandarin-language films